The 1975–76 season was the 74th in the history of the Western Football League.

The champions for the second time in their history, and the second season in succession, were Falmouth Town.

This season was the last in which the league consisted of one single division – a second tier was added for 1976–77.

League table
The league was increased from 21 clubs to 23 after two new clubs joined:

Bideford, rejoining from the Southern League having last played in the Western League in 1972.
Exeter City Reserves, rejoining after leaving in 1974.

References

1975-76
5